The Mill River is a  long tributary of the Connecticut River in Springfield, Massachusetts. It flows from Watershops Pond (also known as Lake Massasoit) to its confluence with the Connecticut River. It is referred to as "The Miracle Mile" in a 2009 master's thesis that outlines possibilities for reclaiming the river's mouth as a recreational area. As of 2011, the final  of the river, including its mouth, is confined in a pipe underneath Interstate 91, railroad tracks and a car dealership. Many Springfield residents have bemoaned the loss of the Mill River as a recreational area, and hope to gain greater access to both it and Connecticut Rivers in upcoming years. As it has for over a century, today the Mill River serves as a barrier between Springfield neighborhoods. Surrounding it are some of the most densely urbanized locations in Springfield.

At the head of Springfield's Mill River there are steep, stone retaining walls that were built to prevent the river's banks from degrading any further. The Mill River was once valued for its benefits to developing industry. Today, incompatible land uses present a problem to "freeing" the Mill River to become a recreational area again. A 2009 master's thesis has described a plan that could revitalize the Mill River and its surrounding neighborhoods by remaking the river as a recreational attraction, connecting the Connecticut River and the Basketball Hall of Fame with Watershops Pond and Springfield College.

References

Tributaries of the Connecticut River
Rivers of Hampden County, Massachusetts
Geography of Springfield, Massachusetts
Rivers of Massachusetts